Adrian Gryszkiewicz (born 13 December 1999) is a Polish professional footballer who plays as a defender for Raków Częstochowa.

Club career
On 5 June 2022, Gryszkiewicz signed with SC Paderborn in Germany.

On 10 January 2023, Gryszkiewicz returned to his native Poland when he joined Raków Częstochowa on a three-and-a-half year deal with the option for a further year.

Career statistics

Honours
Individual
Ekstraklasa Young Player of the Month: September 2020

References

1999 births
Living people
Sportspeople from Bytom
Polish footballers
Association football defenders
Poland youth international footballers
Górnik Zabrze players
SC Paderborn 07 players
Raków Częstochowa players
Ekstraklasa players
III liga players
Polish expatriate footballers
Expatriate footballers in Germany
Polish expatriate sportspeople in Germany